Electric Ladder (2006) is an album by the American ambient musician Robert Rich.  Rich began recording this album in September 2004 and finished in January 2006 at Soundscape Studio in Mountain View, California.  The album was released on June 1, 2006.  This album returns to a more active and sequenced style that Rich explored in Geometry (1991) and Gaudí (1991).

Track listing
”Electric Ladder” – 10:32
”Shadowline” – 8:45
”Poppy Fields” – 7:16
”Sky Tunnel” – 9:05
”Concentric” – 6:27
”Aquifer” – 6:42
”Never Alone” – 6:29

Personnel
Robert Rich – MOTM modular synthesizer, sculpture, TimewARP2600, Metasynth, Wavestation, lap steel guitars, flutes
Paul Hanson – bassoon and soprano saxophone (tracks 3 and 4)
Haroun Serang – acoustic guitar (track 5)

References

External links
album feature from Robert Rich’s official web site

Robert Rich (musician) albums
2006 albums